The Lotus Square or Golden Lotus Square is an open square in Sé, Macau, China. The area features the large bronze sculpture Lotus Flower In Full Bloom and is somewhat akin to the Golden Bauhinia of neighbouring Hong Kong.

Description
The sculpture, made of gilded bronze, weighs 6.5 tonnes, and is 6 metres high. The diameter of the flower is 3.6 metres at maximum. The major part is composed of a stem, petals and pistil—a total of 16 components. The base consists of 23 pieces of red granite in three layers and in the shape of lotus leaves. These signify the three main parts of the territory: Macau Peninsula, Taipa Island and Coloane Island.

The lotus flower in full bloom symbolises the everlasting prosperity of Macau. The sculpture was presented by the State Council of the People's Republic of China in 1999 to mark the transfer of the sovereignty of Macau from Portugal to China. Lotus Square today is popular with skateboarders because of its abundance of ledges, curbs and stairs.

See also 
 Golden Bauhinia Square, Hong Kong

External links

 Lotus Square, Macao Government Tourism Office

Tourist attractions in Macau
Squares in Macau
Sé, Macau